The Combat of Monte de Urra (Spanish: Combate de Monte de Urra) was a military engagement between liberal rebels and government forces that took place during the Chilean Revolution of 1851. The battle took place in Monte de Urra just north of Chillán.

References

Conflicts in 1851
1851 in Chile
Battles involving Chile
History of Biobío Region
es:Combate de Monte de Urra